Moderate Christianity is a  theological movement in Christianity that seeks to make decisions based on spiritual wisdom.

Origin 
Moderation in Christianity is related to the spiritual wisdom that is addressed in Epistle of James in chapter 3 verse 17.  In First Epistle to Timothy,  moderation is also referred to as temperance and is a required characteristic to be bishop in the Church.

Characteristics 
Moderate Christianity is characterized by its concern to bring hope, to include cultural diversity and creative collaboration, by not being fundamentalist or  liberal, predominantly  conservative and avoids extremism in its decisions.

Catholicism 
Moderate Catholicism mainly became visible in the 18th century, with Catholic groups taking more moderate positions, such as supporting ecumenism and liturgical reforms.  These moderates are also overwhelmingly in favor of state autonomy and the independence of Church doctrine from the state.  After Vatican Council II, moderate Catholics distanced themselves from traditionalist Catholicism.

Evangelical Christianity 
Moderate evangelical Christianity emerged in the 1940s in the United States in response to the  Fundamentalist movement of the 1910s.  The Fuller Theological Seminary founded in Pasadena, California in 1947 had considerable influence in the movement.  The study of the Bible has been accompanied by certain disciplines such as Biblical hermeneutics, Biblical exegesis and apologetics.  Moderate theologians have become more present in Bible colleges and more moderate theological positions have been adopted in evangelical churches.  In this movement called neo-evangelicalism, new organizations, social agencies, media and Bible colleges were established in the 1950s.

See also
 Christian fundamentalism
 Conservative Christianity
 Liberal Christianity
 Progressive Christianity
 Political moderate

References 

Christian philosophy
Christian theological movements
Christian terminology